N-Iodosuccinimide (NIS) is a reagent used in organic chemistry for the iodination of alkenes and as a mild oxidant.

NIS is the iodine analog of N-chlorosuccinimide (NCS) and N-bromosuccinimide (NBS) which are used for similar applications.

References

Reagents for organic chemistry
Succinimides
Organoiodides